Juan Leiva (17 July 1932 – 16 June 1983) was a Venezuelan sprinter. He competed in the men's 100 metres at the 1952 Summer Olympics.

References

External links
 

1932 births
1983 deaths
Athletes (track and field) at the 1952 Summer Olympics
Venezuelan male sprinters
Olympic athletes of Venezuela
Pan American Games medalists in athletics (track and field)
Pan American Games silver medalists for Venezuela
Pan American Games bronze medalists for Venezuela
Athletes (track and field) at the 1951 Pan American Games
Athletes (track and field) at the 1955 Pan American Games
Medalists at the 1955 Pan American Games
Central American and Caribbean Games medalists in athletics
Sportspeople from Maracaibo
20th-century Venezuelan people